Pimpin' Phernelia is the fourth studio album by American rapper Dru Down. It was released on August 28, 2001 via AMC American Music/Loon E Bin Productions/Pimp On Records. Pimpin' Phernelia charted significantly on two different Billboard charts, peaking at #81 on the Top R&B/Hip-Hop Albums chart and #15 on the Independent Albums chart.

Track listing
"The Pimp Hunters" 
"I'm A Pimp" 
"What's Wrong?" 
"I'm Ready" 
"Life Story" (Featuring Johnny "Hook" Adams)  
"No Underwear" (Featuring Enemy, Yukmouth)  
"I Do" (Featuring Space)   
"Tha Track" (Interlude) 
"Hey There, Hi There" 
"You Know" (Featuring Pinky)  
"Ms. Freaky" (Interlude) 
"Nasty" (Featuring Boss)  
"Money" (Featuring J. Corleone, Malikah)  
"Let's Get High" 
"Make U Wanna"   
"Things May Change" 
"Lap Dance" (Featuring Sisqo)  
"Convo" (Featuring Lil' Pimpydo)  
"No. 2"

Charts

References

External links

2001 albums
Dru Down albums